The 2019 Zagreb Ladies Open was a professional tennis tournament played on outdoor clay courts. It was the ninth edition of the tournament which was part of the 2019 ITF Women's World Tennis Tour. It took place in Zagreb, Croatia between 2 and 8 September 2019.

Singles main-draw entrants

Seeds

 1 Rankings are as of 26 August 2019.

Other entrants
The following players received wildcards into the singles main draw:
  Lea Bošković
  Mihaela Đaković
  Silvia Njirić
  Antonia Ružić

The following player received entry as a special exempt:
  Tena Lukas

The following players received entry from the qualifying draw:
  Estelle Cascino
  Maryna Chernyshova
  Alena Fomina
  Dea Herdželaš
  Réka Luca Jani
  Victoria Kan
  Despina Papamichail
  Nina Potočnik

Champions

Singles

 Maryna Chernyshova def.  Réka Luca Jani, 6–1, 6–4

Doubles

 Anna Bondár /  Paula Ormaechea def.  Amandine Hesse /  Daniela Seguel, 7–5, 7–5

References

External links
 2019 Zagreb Ladies Open at ITFtennis.com

2019 ITF Women's World Tennis Tour
2019 in Croatian tennis
September 2019 sports events in Europe
Zagreb Ladies Open